Jiříkov is a town in Děčín District in the Ústí nad Labem Region of the Czech Republic. It has about 3,500 inhabitants.

Administrative parts
The town is made up of town parts of Filipov, Loučné, Nový Jiříkov and Starý Jiříkov.

Geography
It lies in the salient region of Šluknov Hook, on the border with Germany. The town is urbanistically fused with the neighbouring town of Ebersbach-Neugersdorf.

Jiříkov is situated in the Lusatian Highlands. The Jiříkovský Stream flows through the town.

Transport
There is a road border crossing and railway border crossing Jiříkov / Ebersbach.

References

External links

 

Cities and towns in the Czech Republic
Populated places in Děčín District